Deer Creek Township is a township in Henry County, in the U.S. state of Missouri.

Deer Creek Township was established in 1873, taking its name from Deer Creek.

References

Townships in Missouri
Townships in Henry County, Missouri